Bishop of Jerusalem may refer to:

Early bishops of Jerusalem (until 451)
Greek Orthodox Patriarch of Jerusalem
Syriac Orthodox Archbishop of Jerusalem
Latin Patriarch of Jerusalem
Armenian Patriarch of Jerusalem
Coptic Orthodox Archbishop of Jerusalem
Church of the East bishop of Jerusalem
Anglican Archbishop in Jerusalem